Northeastern Antioquia is a subregion in the Colombian Department of Antioquia. The region is made up by 10 municipalities.

Municipalities
 Amalfi
 Anorí
 Cisneros
 Remedios
 San Roque
 Santo Domingo
 Segovia
 Vegachi
 Yali
 Yolombo

Regions of Antioquia Department